The Gordolasque is a mountain river that flows from the Mercantour National Park in the Alpes-Maritimes department of southeastern France. Its source is in the Maritime Alps, near the Italian border. It flows into the river Vésubie below the perched village of Belvédère.

References

External links
 http://www.lagordolasque.com    La Gordolasque | Photographs Mountain | Alpes-Maritimes  France

Mercantour National Park
Rivers of France
Rivers of Alpes-Maritimes
Rivers of Provence-Alpes-Côte d'Azur